Harrison is a city in and the county seat of Boone County, Arkansas, United States. It is named after General Marcus LaRue Harrison, a surveyor who laid out the city along Crooked Creek at Stifler Springs. According to 2019 Census Bureau estimates, the population of the city was 13,069, up from 12,943 at the 2010 census and it is the 30th largest city in Arkansas based on official 2019 estimates from the U.S. Census Bureau. Harrison is the principal city of the Harrison Micropolitan Statistical Area, which includes all of Boone and Newton counties.

The community has a history of racism: there were two race riots in the early 20th century and an influx of white supremacist organizations during the late 20th and early 21st centuries. Because of this, a number of sources have called it "the most racist town in the United States".

History

Pre-colonial history 
Native Americans were the earliest inhabitants of the area, probably beginning with cliff dwellers who lived in caves in the bluffs along the rivers. In later times, the Osage, a branch of the Sioux, was the main tribe in the Ozarks, and one of their larger villages is thought to have been to the east of the present site of Harrison. The Shawnee, Quapaw, and Caddo people were also familiar to the area.

The Cherokee arrived around 1816 and did not get along with the Osage. This hostility erupted into a full-scale war in the Ozark Mountains. By the 1830s, both tribes were removed to Indian Territory.

It is possible that the first Europeans to visit the area were some forty followers of Hernando de Soto and that they camped at a Native village on the White River at the mouth of Bear Creek. It is more likely that the discoverers were French hunters or trappers who followed the course of the White River.

19th century
In early 1857, the Baker-Fancher wagon train assembled at Beller's Stand, south of Harrison. On September 11, 1857, approximately 120 members of this wagon train were murdered near Mountain Meadows, Utah Territory, by attacking local Mormon militia and members of the Paiute Indian tribe. In 1955, a monument to memorialize the victims of the massacre was placed on the Harrison town square.

Boone County was organized in 1869, during Reconstruction after the Civil War. Harrison was platted and made the county seat. It is named after Marcus LaRue Harrison, a Union officer who surveyed and platted the town. The town of Harrison was incorporated on March 1, 1876.

20th century
In 1905 and 1909, white race riots occurred in Harrison which drove away black residents and established the community as one of hundreds of sundown towns in the South.

The bank robber and convicted murderer Henry Starr was in Harrison on February 18, 1921, when Starr and three companions entered the People's State Bank and robbed it of $6,000.00. During the robbery, Starr was shot by the former president of the bank, William J. Myers. Starr was carried to the town jail, where he died the next morning.

On May 7, 1961, heavy rain caused Crooked Creek, immediately south of the downtown business district, to flood the town square and much of the southwestern part of the city. Water levels inside buildings reached eight feet (2.5 m). Many small buildings and automobiles were swept away. According to the American Red Cross, four people died, 80 percent of the town's business district was destroyed, and over 300 buildings were damaged or destroyed in losses exceeding $5.4 million.
In 1962, Sam Walton opened his second WalMart store in Harrison.

In 1982, Kingdom Identity Ministries, an anti-gay Christian Identity outreach ministry identified as a hate group by the Southern Poverty Law Center, was founded in Harrison.

21st century

Harrison's Community Task Force on Race Relations was established in 2003 to "promote diversity and respond to racial-bias accusations against the city". City officials have made efforts to counteract organized racist activity with educational forums and billboards promoting tolerance. They also attempted to downplay the city's racist reputation and improve its image by editing the town's Wikipedia article.

In 2014, a peace march and vigil celebrating the life and legacy of Martin Luther King Jr. was held in downtown Harrison, hosted by the Arkansas Martin Luther King Jr. Commission. In December of the same year, a dedication was held for a Confederate monument in Harrison.

In 2017, Mayor Dan Sherrell and Boone County Judge Robert Hathaway signed proclamations recognizing June as Confederate Heritage and History Month.

Kevin Cheri, who became the first African-American employed in the area in 1978, received death threats shortly after his arrival, which prompted him to leave the area. He returned in 2007, and in 2019 was recognized by mayor Jerry Jackson when Harrison issued its first-ever Black History Month proclamation.

In June 2020, a group of around 300 gathered in Harrison to protest police brutality in the murder of George Floyd while 15 people armed with rifles and displaying Confederate and American flags looked on. 

 
 the Southern Poverty Law center lists the following hate groups as having Harrison locations: Kingdom Identity Ministries (founded in Harrison), and League of the South. 

In January, 2023, Nathan Smith proposed flag designs for the city of Harrison. Smith also proposed a flag for the Lead Hill School District.

Geography
U.S. Routes 62, 65, and 412 pass through Harrison. U.S. 65 leads north  to Branson, Missouri, and south  to Conway, Arkansas. U.S. 62 leads west  to Eureka Springs and beyond to Rogers and Bentonville. U.S. 412 leads west  to Springdale. U.S. 62 and 412 combined lead east  to Mountain Home.

Climate
The climate in this area is characterized by hot, humid summers and generally mild to cool winters. According to the Köppen Climate Classification system, Harrison has a humid subtropical climate, abbreviated "Cfa" on climate maps.

Demographics

2020 census

As of the 2020 United States census, there were 13,069 people, 5,578 households, and 3,198 families residing in the city.

2010 census
As of the census of 2010, there were 12,943 people and 6,043 housing units in the city. The racial makeup of the city was 96.2% White, 0.3% Black or African American, 0.6% American Indian and Alaska Native, 0.7% Asian, 0.0% Pacific Islander, and 1.6% from two or more races. 2.2% of the population were Hispanic or Latino of any race.

23.2% of the population was under the age of 18, and 19.0% were 65 years of age or older. Females made up 53.1% of the population, and males made up 46.9% of the population.

The median income for the period 2007–11 for a household in the city was $33,244, and the number of people living below the poverty level was 15.1%. The median value of owner-occupied housing units was $108,700.

Economy
Harrison is home of the general office of FedEx Freight, a leading Less-Than-Load (LTL) freight carrier. Arkansas Freightways, later renamed to American Freightways, was combined with Viking Freight to become FedEx Freight in February 2001.

Major employers
FedEx Freight Inc. (Trucking and distribution)
North Arkansas Regional Medical Center (Medical services)
Walmart Inc. (Retail)
Pace Industries (Aluminum die-casting)
Claridge Products and Equipment, Inc. (Markerboards, chalkboards and bulletin boards)
Windstream (Telecommunications)
Wabash Wood Products (Trailer floor manufacturing)
North Arkansas College (Education)
WestRock, formerly RockTenn Company (Folding Paperboard Cartons)

Architecture

The Boone County Courthouse, built in 1909, and the Boone County Jail, built in 1914, were both designed by architect Charles L. Thompson and are listed on the U.S. National Register of Historic Places.

Arts and culture

Annual cultural events

Harrison hosts the annual Arkansas Hot Air Balloon races each September, Crawdad Days Music Festival each May, a Harvest Homecoming festival each October, and Christmas celebration in December.

Museums and other points of interest

The National Trust for Historic Preservation has recognized the Harrison Courthouse Square Historic District. It contains a large number of the city's original commercial and governmental structures, including the still-used courthouse in the center of the square, the recently refurbished Lyric Theater, and the 1929 Hotel Seville, which underwent a complete restoration in 2008.

Ozark Arts Council
The Ozarks Arts Council is a 501(c)3 non-profit organization established in 1996 with the mission "To enrich lives by promoting the arts in Harrison and North Arkansas through exhibitions, performances, and education." It provides administrative support and distributes financial and in-kind donations to its member organizations:
The Theatre Company
Northark Drama
Twentieth Century Club
Woman's Book Club
Ozark Children's Choir

The historic Lyric Theatre is managed by the Ozark Arts Council. Originally opened as a movie theater in 1929, it is now used for plays, community events, old movies and other gatherings.

Parks and recreation
Harrison serves as the National Park Service's Buffalo National River headquarters. The park was established in the 1970s, and was the nation's first national river.

Crooked Creek, a nationally recognized "Blue Ribbon" smallmouth bass fishery, flows through Harrison.

On the same bluff line is Diamond Falls, at  the second tallest in the state.

Education

Residents are served by the Harrison School District. The Harrison High School mascot is the Golden Goblin. Harrison is also home to North Arkansas College (Northark). The Harrison School District had been a member of the North Central Association of Colleges and Schools since 1936 until its dissolution in 2014. It is now a member of the AdvancED commission.

Media

Print
Harrison and Boone County have been served by the local newspaper The Harrison Daily Times since 1876.

Radio
Radio stations broadcasting from Harrison include:
KBPB 91.9 FM (Religious)
KCWD 96.1 FM (Classic Rock)
KHBZ 102.9 FM (Country)
KHOZ 900 AM (Nostalgia)
KHOZ 94.9 FM (Nostalgia)
KBHQ 100.7 FM (Classic Rock)

Television
Harrison has two stations of its own, including KXMP-LD and K26GS-D (both in Harrison proper). Harrison KTKO-TV 8.1, also known as TKO 8, provides coverage for local events including Goblin Sports, Harrison City Council meetings, and Boone County Quorum Court meetings. It is an affiliate of the Me-TV Network showing a wide range of classic television programming. K26GS is a This TV affiliate and also provides local programming to Harrison. KWBM, a Daystar affiliate, is also licensed to Harrison, however its offices are in Springfield, while its transmitter is located in Taney County, Missouri. KWBM leases part of its signal to Springfield Fox affiliate KRBK, in order to relay reliable Fox TV coverage to Harrison and the southern portions of the Springfield TV market.

Harrison is part of the Springfield, Missouri, television market, and receives stations from Springfield, including: KYTV (NBC), KOLR (CBS), KSPR (ABC), KOZL (MyNetworkTV), and KRBK (Fox).

It was also featured in a BBC TV show in the UK named Miriam's Big American Adventure, hosted by Miriam Margolyes.

Infrastructure

Transportation
A segment of the route between Seligman, Missouri and Harrison, Arkansas was operated as the Arkansas & Ozarks Railroad from 1948 to 1960.

Harrison is served by Boone County Regional Airport. Scheduled flights from Harrison to Memphis, Tennessee, and Dallas/Fort Worth, Texas, are offered by Southern Airways Express. The closest airport with service from a carrier aside from Southern Airways Express is Branson Airport (served only by Frontier Airlines), and the closest airport served by multiple airlines or a legacy carrier is Northwest Arkansas National Airport.

Highways in the area include:
 US 62/US 412
 U.S. Highway 65
 U.S. Route 65 Business
 Arkansas Highway 7
 Arkansas Highway 43
 Arkansas Highway 123
 Arkansas Highway 392
 Arkansas Highway 397
 Arkansas Highway 980

Health care

The recently renovated North Arkansas Regional Medical Center is in Harrison.

Notable people

 Daniel Boatwright, Democratic politician in California
 Brandon Burlsworth, All-American offensive lineman, played for the Arkansas Razorbacks in the late 1990s; Drafted by the Indianapolis Colts in the third round of the 1999 NFL Draft
 John Burris, politician
 Faye Della Wilson Copeland, born in Harrison, along with her husband Ray became the oldest couple sentenced to death in the U.S.
 Courtney Rae Hudson, Arkansas Supreme Court justice, was born in Harrison
 John Paul Hammerschmidt, U.S. representative, 1967–1993, author of the law preserving the Buffalo National River as a free-flowing stream and adding it to the National Park System in 1972
 Ben C. Henley, lawyer, businessman, and chairman of the Arkansas Republican Party from 1955 to 1962, U.S. Senate candidate in 1956, lived in Harrison
 J. Smith Henley, federal judge, retired to senior status in Harrison; the federal building in Harrison is named in his honor
 Elgin Bryce Holt, geologist
 H. Dale Jackson, ethicist
 Uvalde Lindsey, politician
 Brian McComas, country-western singer, originally from Harrison
 Bryce Molder, professional golfer, was born in Harrison
 Gracie Pfost, first woman elected to Congress from Idaho, was born in Harrison
 Charles Robinson, Arkansas State Treasurer; native of Harrison
 Tim Sherrill, former pitcher for the St. Louis Cardinals from 1990 to 1991
 Vance Trimble, Pulitzer Prize-winning journalist
 Robert Wadley, politician
 William Wirt Watkins, politician
 John A. White, President of the University of Arkansas
 Jack Williams, Medal of Honor recipient

In popular culture
In 2020, the video Holding a Black Lives Matter Sign in America's Most Racist Town was filmed in Harrison.

References

Further reading

External links

City of Harrison official website
Harrison Convention & Visitors Bureau
Harrison entry in the Encyclopedia of Arkansas
City government information from local..gov

 
Cities in Boone County, Arkansas
Cities in Arkansas
Harrison, Arkansas micropolitan area
County seats in Arkansas
Populated places established in 1869
1869 establishments in Arkansas
Sundown towns in Arkansas
White supremacy in the United States